Sven-Eric Gamble (10 August 1924 – 10 May 1976) was a Swedish film actor.

Selected filmography

References

External links

1924 births
1976 deaths
Male actors from Stockholm
20th-century Swedish male actors